Aikyatan is a progressive drama group based in Guwahati in Assam founded by humor writer and film critic Pabitra Kumar Deka, historian and former principal of Cotton College Udayaditya Bharali, writer Anil Kumar Deka, noted editor of Assamese daily Asomiya Pratidin Nitya Bora and others in 1976. 
 It has produced many memorable plays like Janani, Surjastak, Panchatantra, Sinhasan Khali, Hewers of Coal, Upahar, Night of January 16, and A Doll's House.

The play Night of January 16th directed by National award-winning film director Sanjeev Hazarika was also performed for Guwahati Doordarshan on the occasion of World Theatre Day on 27 March 1990. Formerly, the group was called Naxa Natya Parishad in the late sixties and early seventies. Its most famous stage production was the Assamese adaptation of Bertolt Brecht play Maa (Mother) based on the story of Maxim Gorky in 1974 in Guwahati. The play was translated by Pabitra Kumar Deka, advisor was Kulada Kumar Bhattacharya, direction by Ratna Ojha with music by Bhupen Hazarika. The People's Art Theatre of Kolkata performed their three famous plays called Kolkatar Hemlet, Mrityuhin Pran and 1799 in Assam under Naxa Natya Parishad in 1974. The plays were directed by Asit Basu with music by Hemango Biswas.

Aikyatan Sangeet Vidyalay, a school for learning western music like guitar, mandolin & violin and Hindustani vocal & tabla, was also formed by Aikyatan. The school was led by music exponents Dr Loknath Subba, Pusparanjan Dey and Kishour Giri for more than two decades. Kalyan Baruah, an acclaimed musician of the country, learned guitar in the music school of Aikyatan during the eighties.

The group was most prominent in the 1970s and 1980s. Since the early 2010s, it has been revived once again by filmmaker Prodyut Kumar Deka with the production of intimate plays like Apekhyat, Rising of the Moon, The Game of Chess, etc. Aikyatan performed a play Coffee Housot Apeksha under the aegis of Indian People's Theatre Association (IPTA), Assam chapter on the occasion of its platinum jubilee in 2019 at District Library, Guwahati.

Major Productions
Under Naxa Natya Parishad

1974 --- Maa (Mother) - Written by Bertolt Brecht, direction by Ratna Oza
1974 --- Kolkatar Hemlet - Performed by People's Art Theatre, Kolkata
1974 --- Mrityuhin Pran - Performed by People's Art Theatre, Kolkata
1974 --- 1799 - Performed by People's Art Theatre, Kolkata

Under Aikyatan

1976 --- Dhanani - Written by Ratan Ghosh, direction by Ratna Oza
1977 --- Akonihotor Suwoni Desh (Opera) - Written by Tarun Sarma, direction by Pranjal Saikia
1977 --- Jukti Tarko - Written by Albert Camus, direction by Dulal Roy
1978 --- Janani - Written by Arati Das Boiragi, direction by Govind Gupta
1978 --- Surjastak - Written by C R Das, direction by Govind Gupta
1979 --- Asami Hazir (The Man who thought for himself) - Written by Neil Grant, direction by Aikyatan
1979 --- Sinhashan Khali - Written by Sushil Singha, direction by Krishnamurti Hazarika
1980 --- Panchatantra (Opera) - Direction by Garima Hazarika
1981 --- Hewers of Coal - Written by Joe Corrie, direction by Sanjeev Hazarika
1984 --- Upahar - Written by Sharada Kanta Bordoloi, direction by Aikyatan
1984 --- Chorus - Performed by Dipak Sangha, Dibrugarh, Written & directed by Munin Sharma
1985 --- Ramleela (Shadow Play) - Performed by Uday Shankar School of Dance Music Ballet, Kolkata
1989 --- Night of January 16th - Written by Ayn Rand, direction by Sanjeev Hazarika
1990 --- Potola Ghar (Dolls House) - Written by Henrik Ibsen, direction by Sanjeev Hazarika
1991 --- Mukabhinoy Sandhiya (Pantomime) - Performed by Niranjan Goswami (Kolkata) & Moinul Hoque (Assam)
2016 --- Jonakar Pohar (Rising of the Moon) - Written by Lady Gregory, direction by Prodyut Kumar Deka
2018 --- The Game of Chess - Written by Kenneth Sawyer Goodman, direction by Prodyut Kumar Deka

References

See also 
 Pabitra Kumar Deka
 Prodyut Kumar Deka

 
Theatre companies in India
Cultural organisations based in India